The Bishop of Emly was a separate episcopal title which took its name after the village of Emly in County Tipperary, Republic of Ireland. In both the Church of Ireland and the Roman Catholic Church, it has been united with other sees.

History 
The monastery in Emly was founded by Saint Ailbe in the 6th century. After his death there was a succession of abbots of Emly, a few of whom were also consecrated as bishops. In 1118, the Diocese of Emly became one of the twenty-four dioceses established at the Synod of Ráth Breasail. The diocese's boundaries were formally set out by the Synod of Kells in 1152, and consisted of a small portion of west County Tipperary, east County Limerick and southeast County Clare.

After the Reformation in Ireland there were parallel apostolic successions: one of the Church of Ireland and the other of the Roman Catholic Church.

In the Church of Ireland, the see of Emly was united to the archepiscopal see of Cashel by an Act of Parliament in 1568. Under the Church Temporalities (Ireland) Act 1833, the bishopric of Waterford and Lismore was united to the archbishopric of Cashel and Emly on 14 August 1833. On the death of Archbishop Laurence in 1838, the archepiscopal see lost its metropolitan status and became the bishopric of Cashel and Waterford. Through reorganisation in the Church of Ireland in 1976, the bishopric of Emly was transferred to the bishopric of Limerick and Killaloe.

In the Roman Catholic Church, the see of Emly had an unsettled history from the mid-16th to the early 18th century. During that period, there were only three bishops and one vicar apostolic appointed, one of whom was executed. In 1695, James Stritch was nominated to be bishop, but is doubtful if he took possession of the see. The rest of the time there were long periods the see was vacant or administered by the archbishops of Cashel. On 10 May 1718, Pope Clement XI decreed the union of the sees of Cashel and Emly.

Pre-Reformation bishops

Post-Reformation bishops

Church of Ireland succession

Catholic succession

Notes 
  Raymond Burke was bishop of both successions when they were reunited during the reign of Queen Mary I.

References

Bibliography 

 
 
 
 

Emly
Emly
Emly
 Emly
Bishops of Cashel and Ossory
Diocese of Cashel and Ossory
Roman Catholic Archdiocese of Cashel and Emly